Gynandromyia kibatiana is a species of tachinid flies in the genus Gynandromyia of the family Tachinidae.

References

Exoristinae
Insects described in 1962